The character of Superman was created by Jerry Siegel and Joe Shuster, and has been continually published in a variety of DC Comics book titles since its premiere in 1938. There have been several versions of Superman over the years, both as the main hero in the stories as well as several alternative versions.

In mainstream comic continuity
Originally, there was only one Superman. However, beginning in the late 1940s, demand for comics shifted from superheroes as war, horror, science fiction and romance comics became more popular. Most of the DC Comics superhero titles were cancelled or began featuring the more popular genres. Superman, along with Batman and Wonder Woman, continued to be published. To explain how Superman could have been active as a young man in the 1930s when later stories show Superman still youthful in the 1960s, DC Comics developed a multiverse, the existence of several realities. The original Golden Age Superman was retconned to Earth-Two, while the then-currently published hero was assigned to Earth-One.

In addition to these main two "official" variations of the standard Superman character, a number of characters have assumed the title of Superman in many variant stories set in both primary and alternative continuity. Following the storyline of The Death of Superman and during the subsequent Reign of the Supermen storyline, a number of characters claimed the mantle. In addition, Bizarro, for instance, is an imperfect duplicate of Superman. Other members of Superman's family of characters have borne the Super- prefix, including Supergirl, Krypto the Superdog and, in some instances, Superwoman.

Pre-Crisis 1938-1986
Superman was first published in 1938. In 1986, DC Comics published Crisis on Infinite Earths, a 12-issue series designed to clean up and establish a new continuity for DC, affecting not only Superman, but all of the DC Comics characters. The versions of Superman from this time period are traditionally divided into three main periods.

Golden Age 1938-1950s
The first version of Superman began being published by DC Comics in 1938 appearing in Action Comics #1. To explain discrepancies in the aging of Superman across several decades, his earliest stories were retroactively portrayed as having taken place on an alternative world called Earth-Two. These stories take place from 1938 until the late 1950s, although the exact dividing line is unclear and some stories happened identically to both the Golden Age and Silver Age Supermen. The Golden Age Superman started his career leaping tall buildings rather than flying, had heat from his x-ray vision and not heat vision as the Earth-One hero did. In addition, he had a very limited ability to change his facial features to resemble other men of similar height and build that the other Superman lacked. The Golden Age Superman (Kal-L) is the first primary superhero of Earth-Two, who began his career as an adult and emerges just before World War II. He is a member of the Justice Society and, during World War II, the All-Star Squadron. As Clark Kent, he works for the Daily Star as a reporter and eventually becomes Editor-in-Chief. Clark eventually marries Lois Lane and settles down with her for several decades, and when Kal-L's long-lost cousin Power Girl arrives on Earth, they become her surrogate parents. Kal-L is erased from Earth's history after the events of Crisis on Infinite Earths, but survives and enters a "paradise" dimension, where he remains until the events of Infinite Crisis. Shortly after his wife passes away, Kal-L dies at the conclusion of Infinite Crisis while battling Superboy-Prime. His main two foes are the Ultra-Humanite and the red-haired Lex Luthor. In addition, his "S" symbol on his chest is generally drawn in a less distinctive manner. While the Golden Age Superman is generally viewed as weaker than his Earth-One counterpart, he did battle the Earth-One Superman to a standstill in Justice League of America #74. Stories taking place in the 1970s and 1980s featuring this version of Superman are usually labelled Earth-Two stories.

Silver Age 1950s-1971 
The more significant differences between the Golden Age version (later equated with Kal-L of Earth-Two) and Silver Age version (Kal-El of Earth-One) of Superman includes the Silver Age Kal-El begins his public, costumed career as Superboy at the age of eight, more than a decade before nearly all other Earth-One heroes. Superboy only finds super-powered peers in the 30th-century Legion of Super-Heroes, though he also meets as a teenager Earth-One's only other major superpowered hero, "Aquaboy" (the teenaged Aquaman). Luthor meets Superboy in Smallville when they are teens; the two are briefly friends before they become mortal enemies, years before they become adults. As an adult, Clark Kent works at the Daily Planet and Superman is a founding member of the Justice League of America The Silver Age Superman also has greatly enhanced powers compared to Kal-L.  His main villain is the bald Lex Luthor.

The Silver Age Superman was typically characterized as being more grounded in reality than previous depictions, in that he was portrayed with a realistic appearance and embedded within logical and rationalistic narratives. While these were still based on the science fiction of his earlier iterations, Superman was portrayed in storylines that sought to uncover the mysteries of the world through observation and the use of evidence, including the concept of limits and the consequences of human action. This definition is attributed to Curt Swan, who was the principal artist of Superman comics from 1955 to 1985. Swan's extensive work on the character, which was responsible for much of the public perception of the superhero, emphasized anatomical realism, embedding in the character a sense of Norman Rockwellesque Americana. This depiction of the superhero resonated with the readers as indicated in the way some observers saw their own lived experiences in his stories.

Bronze Age 1971-1986
In 1971, Dennis O'Neil and Julius Schwartz set out to simplify Superman's overelaborate framework. They streamlined the Superman mythos by downsizing his abilities and reducing his power levels. This version only lasted a few issues. DC attempted more of a soft reboot in the 45th Anniversary issue of Action Comics. Lex Luthor and Brainiac were updated and modernized to make them more visibly dangerous for Superman. The Silver/Bronze Age (Earth-One) Superman was given a send-off in the Alan Moore-penned "imaginary story" Whatever Happened to the Man of Tomorrow? (1986). Colloquially known as "The Last Superman Story", it was a literal conclusive ending to Superman's story as a character. The story was originally conceived by senior editor Julius Schwartz, who designed a triumphant goodbye for the flagship hero in his final two Superman issues (prior to the John Byrne The Man of Steel relaunch) - Superman (vol. 1) #423 and Action Comics (vol. 1) #583 (1986). Both comics were illustrated by the long-tenured, mainstay Superman artist Curt Swan.

Other Pre-Crisis versions
Before Crisis, the Multiverse was also used to explain an "evil" version of Superman from Earth-Three as well as other versions that officially existed. Earth-95 had Jor-El rescue his entire family. Earth-149 saw Lex Luthor succeed in killing Superman.: Earth-Prime was designated as the "real" world, even though Superboy-Prime is from that universe. This version of Clark Kent is from a world without other superpowered beings, where he grows to adolescence reading about the DC superheroes in comic books. During the Crisis on Infinite Earths, he gains powers like those of the Silver Age Superboy and helps to defeat the Anti-Monitor. However, his own world is lost and Superboy-Prime himself is confined to Limbo.

In addition to official versions, other stories listed as "What Ifs" or imaginary stories which were not originally an official part of DC continuity. One example, Superman Red/Superman Blue was the subject of several story lines. The Silver Age version of the tale was an "imaginary story" in which Superman splits into two beings, one which marries Lois Lane, and the other marries Lana Lang, and both are happy. Both retained their powers, with one having all red removed from his costume and the other having all blue removed. In Superman #300, a story imagines what would have happened if Superman had landed in the middle of the Cold War, with both the U.S. and the USSR trying to capture the capsule as it is landing. Kent is a reporter for a worldwide news service, and takes the name Skyboy.

Post-Crisis: 1986-present
The Multiverse system was discarded in the aftermath of Crisis on Infinite Earths limited series (1986) by rebooting all of DC's various stories and continuities into one timeline taking place on a single Earth (later described as New Earth). A more modern adaptation of the mainstream "Earth-One" Superman debuted in John Byrne's The Man of Steel miniseries in 1986. The post-Crisis Superman was the Superman from 1986 to 2011. Superman's backstory was heavily revised and many Silver Age elements, such as his career as Superboy, were removed. Significant changes included a reimagining of all Kryptonians being genetically bound to Krypton, making it fatal for them to leave the planet. Jor-El devises a serum to counter this, which he administers to baby Kal-El. DC used this plot device to make Superman Krypton's sole survivor until this was retconned in the mid 2000s to introduce the post-Crisis Kara Zor-El. Krypton was also reimagined as an emotionless and sterile society where all their babies were grown in a birthing matrix as Kryptonians found sexual reproduction to be barbaric. Clark never becomes Superboy, with his powers manifesting gradually as he matures in age. His power level is also toned down to where he is no longer able to travel through time with his super speed, is not strong enough to push planets out of orbit like his Silver Age incarnation, and will be at least disorientated if not outright hurt if forced to confront a nuclear explosion. Clark also spends some years traveling the globe trying to find himself after leaving Smallville and before settling in Metropolis, performing various low-key rescues before a crashing plane forces him to make a more public debut. Other differences include Lex Luthor as a business mogul with secret criminal dealings rather than a supergenius scientist who is a known crook to the public; both of his parents alive and well in the present; only green kryptonite existing (until the mid 2000s) and Superman thinking of himself as Clark Kent first, with "Superman" being a persona he adopts to preserve his privacy. Nuances in the characters mythos were later defined in various Superman origin stories, such as Superman: Birthright, where Mark Waid retooled Superman's origin in 2003. The trend continued after Infinite Crisis; when Superman's backstory was retooled once again by Geoff Johns, with Superman: Secret Origin in 2009.

The single-Earth continuity retained the dichotomy of a good and evil Superman by introducing an alternative version of Superman's Earth-Three double, Ultraman in the Antimatter Universe surviving the Crisis, as presented in JLA: Earth 2. Alternative Supermen were also depicted using literary devices such as time travel and "Hypertime". The subsequent sequel to Crisis, titled Infinite Crisis, would see a brief return of the Golden Age Superman, Kal-L as well as the teenage Superman of a world without heroes, who survived the original Crisis.  The modern take on the Superman Blue/Red was a controversial storyline in which Superman develops energy-based powers while losing his original powers, and acquires a corresponding new costume. He eventually splits into two versions of the energy-Superman, known as Superman Red and Superman Blue, before the two Supermen manage to find a way to work together and merge back into one entity.

Due to the events of Infinite Crisis, as revealed in the subsequent weekly series 52, a new multiverse consisting of 52 alternative Earths was created, with most worlds featuring new alternative depictions of Superman. This backstory was kept intact for over a decade until it was revised in Superman: Birthright (2003) by Mark Waid, and then further modified following the events of Infinite Crisis (2006), with the essence of the changes being elaborated on in the subsequent "Superman: Secret Origin" six-issue story arc written by Geoff Johns (debuted September 2009). Many of the Silver Age elements of Superman's biography (such as his meeting Lex Luthor at a younger age and his teenage membership as Superboy in the Legion of Super-Heroes) that were removed in The Man of Steel were restored in these continuity changes. Nonetheless, many of the elements added in the Man of Steel revamp remain in place. This version finally returns in the Convergence (2015) crossover where he and Lois have a son named Jon. Later the three of them travel back in time to the original Crisis on Infinite Earths (1985) in order to avert the collapse of the original Multiverse.

Another fresh incarnation of Superman was introduced in September 2011 in the wake of DC's Flashpoint event and as part of The New 52 publishing relaunch, and was retired in 2016 following the restoration of the post-Crisis Superman. The New 52 Superman's backstory is detailed in the first story arc of the second volume of Action Comics (2011–2012). This latest incarnation of Superman incorporates elements of nearly every previous version, and starts off as a reporter for the Daily Star (later changing to the Daily Planet). He and Lois are friends but not lovers, his parents are dead, and it is not until adulthood that he emerges as Superman. Later, after joining the Justice League, he starts a relationship with Wonder Woman. During the Truth storyline his secret identity is revealed to the world and he largely loses his powers after using a new power he calls a 'Solar Flare'. He struggles with vulnerability for the first time while fighting crime in an improvised way, while also dealing with not being taken as seriously, problems in his relationship with Wonder Woman that eventually cause him to end it, and regaining his powers. However, a combination of different trials, such as exposing himself to kryptonite to purge himself of the radiation inhibiting his powers and absorbing energy from the fire pits of Apokolips, compromise his health. After undergoing tests at the Fortress, Superman confirms that he is dying, eventually turning to dust after saving lives one last time. After this Superman's death, the Post-Crisis Superman- trapped in this reality after the events of the Convergence storyline- takes both his place as the current Superman and his place in the current Justice League, and, with the DC Rebirth initiative (the publisher's attempt to set right unpopular character changes) this Superman is told that there is more to the story of his replacing New 52 Superman than he realizes. At the conclusion of the "Superman Reborn" storyline, the histories of the pre-Flashpoint and New 52 Superman and Lois Lane are merged, effectively writing over the New 52 era as if it never happened and creating another soft reboot for characters in the Superman franchise.

Alternative universe depictions

 In the Silver Age of Comic Books, Earth-1 was home to the mainstream version of Superman known by most readers of DC Comics. Following DC's Flashpoint event, The New 52 Earth-1 is the setting of the Earth One graphic novel series, where Superman is one of a handful of heroes just starting out in modernized retellings of classic origin stories.
 Following 52 (2006), a nearly identical Earth-2 is created with only subtle differences like the Justice Society and Infinity, Inc. combining into the Justice Society Infinity, Green Lantern Alan Scott being dead and Superman being missing for years. Following Flashpoint (2011), the Earth-2 concept is revised again. After Kal-El is killed in an invasion of Earth by Darkseid, a new Kryptonian who resembles a blue eyed black man emerges as Superman, Val-Zod, a pacifist who reconsiders his beliefs in order to defeat an evil clone of Kal-El. Val-Zod is the son of the deceased Zod who, along with Power Girl are both adopted by Jor-El and Lara.
 There are several versions of the evil Superman analogue, Ultraman, who as originally introduced is Superman's evil analogue from Earth-Three. After the Multiverse concept was retired, Ultraman was introduced as an alien from Qward with powers similar to the original; this version made only one appearance. DC later attempted the "evil universe" trope again with the Antimatter Universe in JLA: Earth 2 (2000), introducing an Ultraman who is Lt. Clark Kent, a human astronaut who is experimented on during a deep space mission. He is a member of the Crime Syndicate of Amerika. Following DC's series 52, the maxiseries Countdown introduced a new "Golden Age" Ultraman from the new Earth-3, a member of the Crime Society of America. This Ultraman and his team are analogues for the elder Superman and the Justice Society Infinity of the new Earth-2. Following The New 52 reboot, DC revised Earth-3 again with Forever Evil (2013–14), making Ultraman of Earth-3 Superman from Earth-0's evil counterpart and a Kryptonian once again.
 The Superman of Post-Crisis Earth-4 is Captain Allen Adam, the Quantum Superman, and one of the most powerful beings in all of the 52 Earths. An amalgamation of Captain Atom (a Charlton Comics superhero based on Superman and later acquired by DC) and Dr. Manhattan of the Watchmen maxiseries (a pastiche of Captain Atom), Air Force Captain Allen Adam gained his quantum abilities when he was disintegrated in a blast caused by an experimental U-235 engine. The U-235 particles fused with his body, and his disembodied consciousness built an enhanced copy of his former body, but he keeps his "quantum senses" at a managed level by using drugs. He is one of the Supermen from throughout the Multiverse who are recruited by Monitrix Zillo Valla in Final Crisis: Superman Beyond, and allows the drugs in his system to wear off in order to reach a grander state of being, fusing the consciousness of Ultraman and Superman together in order to operate the Superman Robot in the Monitor world and fight Mandrakk, the Dark Monitor. This version of Captain Atom is revisited in The Multiversity: Pax Americana (2015), which details his origin in more depth.
 On the Post-Crisis Earth-5, Superman's closest analogue is Captain Marvel (originally a Fawcett Comics superhero) as shown in Superman: Beyond and Final Crisis.
 Earth-8 is a Marvel Comics pastiche world, home to villains Lord Havok and the Extremists, who are opposed by Avengers pastiche characters the Meta Militia (a modernization of the Champions of Angor). When visited during Countdown, a German Superman called "Herr Superman", who serves in Monarch's army, is seen, but it is not certain what world he is from. In The New 52, Earth-8 is home to a Superman analogue named Hyperious who is a pastiche of Marvel's own Superman pastiche Hyperion. He is a member of an Avengers pastiche team named the Retaliators. Hyperious' current whereabouts are unknown.
 The Superman from DC's Tangent Comics imprint is a radically different character from the traditional Superman. Due to an experiment conducted on an entire town by a government black ops group called Nightwing, Harvey Dent was the lone infant survivor of a failed super-human program that killed hundreds. After growing to adulthood, and falling from the world's tallest building in an attempt to save a suicidal man, his dormant powers activate and he develops advanced physical and psychic abilities. Evolving millions of years past normal humans, he eventually becomes a "modern-day superhero". He is illustrated as a tall, bald, African American man wearing a blue robe, and carrying a staff. This version of Superman has become the most powerful person on Earth. After attempting to give his wife the same powers as his, through what he thought was a safe version of the experiment, which resulted in her apparent death, Superman instead married that reality's version of Power Girl and decided to protect the entire world by conquering it, as seen in Tangent: Superman's Reign. This Earth is numbered Earth-9 in the DC Multiverse.
 Earth-10, which is under the control of the Nazi Party, depicts an alternative Superman, usually known as Overman, who supports the Nazis' policy of genetic purity. He is a member of the JL-Axis, a Nazi-themed Justice League. Two conflicting artistic renditions of this Superman have been shown. One is a stereotypical blond Aryan with a Nazi swastika replacing the S-shield, while the other is a black-haired twin of the standard Superman with an "S" resembling one from the Schutzstaffel emblem; the latter is portrayed in Superman: Beyond as guilt-ridden. The first blond-haired Superman, along with most of the JL-Axis was likely killed when they were fighting the Monitors on Earth-51 and that entire universe was destroyed by Superman-Prime and Monarch. The second, called Overman, is Karl Kant, a.k.a. Kal-L, whose rocket from Krypton crashed in a field in Czechoslovakia in 1938. Nazi scientists retro engineered technology found in the rocket to win the war, and later unleashed Overman to defeat the USA forces in the 1950s. Overman leads the New Reichsmen, his world's Justice League, consisting of Brunhilde, Leatherwing, Blitzen, the Martian Manhunter, Underwaterman, while fighting Uncle Sam and the Freedom Fighters. He is still mourning the death of his "cousin" Overgirl, from injuries sustained during her crossing of the Multiverse's interstitial Bleed medium. He has growing doubts about his past use as enabler of the Nazi victory, especially after his discovery of an expanded Nazi Holocaust in North America during the fifties and sixties. He is apparently immortal. Although he attempts to halt the fall of the Eagles Ayrie due to Freedom Fighters sabotage, he is unable to prevent its impact in Metropolis and the death of millions. Distraught over Metropolis' destruction, added with his guilt over the millions of deaths that his regime was responsible for, Overman flees Earth for years which causes the Nazis to create a cyborg replacement to take Overman's place.
 On the gender-reversed Earth-11, Earth's greatest hero is Superwoman.
 On Earth-13, Superman's role is filled by Superdemon, a character who shares characteristics with Etrigan the Demon and Superman, and who leads the League of Shadows in a world of magic and cloak-and-dagger adventures.
 Christopher Kent of Earth-16 is introduced in Countdown: Arena (2008) as a "more evolved" Superman who was able to reformat his power source to any energy source he could consciously choose, effortlessly overcoming the Earth-30 and Earth-31 Supermen with energy powers in a head-to-head battle. He was bald and wore a simple black T-shirt and jeans. He dies in an attempt to defeat Monarch using a massive amount of energy that burns out his body. The Earth-16 concept is refreshed following Flashpoint (2011). In The Multiversity (2015), Chris Kent, Superman's son, is the inheritor to his father's legacy in a world with no villains left to fight. Wearing a capeless modern Superman costume, he and his young superhero friends, including his best friend Batman (Damian Wayne), live a vapid party existence filled with parties and classic Justice League battle reenactments.
 The Superman of Pre-Crisis Earth-17 was the original Overman, created by the government as were the other heroes of this Earth. Likewise, all other heroes that were created were modified clones of Overman's cell scrapings, such as versions of Wonder Woman, Flash, and Green Lantern. Some time later, Overman went on a homicidal rampage (due to an STD which had affected his mind) and murdered everyone on the planet before he decided to commit suicide and destroy the planet at the same time with a doomsday bomb. This world was destroyed, and Overman was wiped out by the Crisis, until the Psycho-Pirate began bringing back characters the Crisis had killed in Animal Man #23, Overman and bomb included, despite trying not to remember him. Overman fought against Ultraman and Animal Man, before Overman was dragged out of the comic book panels and wiped out by a closing panel, ranting that it was not his fault he was like that before Animal Man disarmed the bomb. In The New 52 DC Multiverse, Earth-17 is the world of the Atomic Knights and lacks a known Superman analogue.
 Earth-18 is based on the Justice Riders comic; Superman's analogue is Saganowana, a bison-headed Native American hero.
 In Darwyn Cooke's DC: The New Frontier, Superman is one of the heroes of Earth-21, who has been active since the '40s, and still is during the events of the storyline, which occurs during the 1950s. As in Batman: The Dark Knight Returns, he is a government agent, but unlike Dark Knight Returns, he is willing to go against the U.S. government when he feels that the tensions between the humans and superhumans has to end. He is also a friend of Batman, rather than his foe as he is in Dark Knight Returns.

  The Kingdom Come miniseries shows an alternative future in which Kal-El went into self-imposed exile following the death of Lois Lane. He returns after ten years at the behest of Wonder Woman. This alternative Superman resides on Earth-22. He appeared in DC's mainstream continuity in the Justice Society of America story "Thy Kingdom Come", where he joined the Society in battling the being known as Gog. The Kingdom Come Superman is more powerful and less vulnerable to kryptonite than his younger mainstream counterpart, due to far greater exposure to yellow sun radiation (as explained by his Earth's Lex Luthor in the miniseries).
 Final Crisis #7 introduces an African-American version of the Man of Steel who is the President of the United States in his secret identity, President Calvin Ellis (with the Kryptonian name of Kalel). Writer Grant Morrison has confirmed that this Superman is a homage to President Barack Obama. This Superman appears to be multiracial with both African and European features and wears exactly the same costume as the New Earth Superman, except that his "S" insignia is yellow with a red backdrop. In Action Comics vol. 2 #9 (in The New 52) this Superman is redesigned to appear with full African features and a new costume. On Earth-23, African American heroes have risen to positions of prominence (such as Nubia being Wonder Woman) inspired by Superman's legacy. He also leads Earth-23's Justice League and originates from Vathlo Island on Krypton. He plays a big role in The Multiversity (2014-2015) and forms the Justice Incarnate, a team of superheroes from throughout the Multiverse who combat multiversal threats. In Injustice 2, he makes a cameo appearance in Green Arrow's ending working with Red Son Batman, and Flashpoint Wonder Woman to combat the threat posed by various incarnations of Brainiac and ends up saving Green Arrow's Earth from his universe's Brainiac.
 The 1980s series Captain Carrot and His Amazing Zoo Crew presented the parallel Earths of Earth-C and Earth-C-Minus, worlds populated by talking animal superheroes.  Earth-C is home to the heroic Captain Carrot, who does not share Superman's patterning but does have similar abilities and standing in his universe. Earth-C-Minus parallels the mainstream DC Universe, with animal superheroes as members of the superhero team "Just'a Lotta Animals" (JLA). Superman's Earth C-Minus analogue is Super-Squirrel, a "Chiptonian" alien who is jealous of Captain Carrot's relationship with the Wonder Woman analogue of the world. Since 52, the Zoo Crew has resided on Earth-26, and appeared as prominent heroes in Final Crisis (2008), The Multiversity (2014–2015) and Convergence (2015). It is not known if the inhabitants of Earth-C-Minus are on a new Earth.

 In the current DC Multiverse, Earth-29 is a cube-shaped and ringed Bizarro World in a "damaged continuum" that also hosts Sram (Mars-29),  Nnar (Rann-29) and Raganaht (Thanagar-29). It is uncertain whether its Bizarro Superman, therefore, also originated on Notpyrk (Krypton-29).
 Superman: Red Son explores what would have happened if Superman's ship had crashed in the Soviet Union instead of the United States and was raised under the control of Joseph Stalin. The Red Son Superman's birth name is stated to be Kal-L, the same as the aged Pre-Crisis Earth-Two Superman, though he is essentially immortal as shown at the end of this mini-series. Moreover, he is from Earth's distant future and is a descendant of Lex Luthor and Lois Lane. A younger alternative Communist version of the Red Son Superman resides on Earth-30. The Earth-30 Superman was captured by Monarch and forced to join his war against the Monitors in the Countdown series. He is later seen in Final Crisis #7, flying along with 50 other Supermen.
 Prior to Flashpoint, Earth-31 is the setting of Frank Miller's The Dark Knight Returns, The Dark Knight Strikes Again and All Star Batman and Robin the Boy Wonder, first visited in Countdown: Arena #1 (2007). In The Dark Knight Returns and its sequel, Superman is a pawn of the American government in a dystopian United States in the supposed 1980s, and mention of him by the media is implied to be strictly forbidden by the Federal Communications Division. Although Batman and Superman are no longer friends, Superman shows a grudging respect for the Caped Crusader in The Dark Knight Returns, and regrets when his fellow hero supposedly dies.
Following Flashpoint, in the New 52 DC Multiverse, the Earth-31 Superman is a member of the Flying Fox pirate crew on a post-apocalyptic waterworld. The Flying Fox crew is led by a version of Batman named Leatherwing.
 On Earth-32, the closest equivalent to Superman is a fusion of that character and the Martian Manhunter, known as Super-Martian. Super-Martian is a member of the Justice Titans.
 On Earth-34, Savior is the strongest terrestrial metahuman, although his origin and appearance differ from that of Superman, in that he is a survivor of ancient Mu, an Indian Ocean lost continent Meanwhile, Earth-35's Supremo is its alternate Superman, as is Earth-36's slain Optiman. Creator Grant Morrison has said that these three Supermen and worlds are based on Justice League pastiches created by other writers for rival DC publishing houses, now pastiched in turn by DC and made a part of its official Multiverse.
 On the world of JSA: The Liberty Files, on the pre-Flashpoint Earth-40, the Superman was Zod, a sociopath banished to the Phantom Zone for creating a deadly synthetic plague when he was eleven. When American scientists breached the Zone in an experiment, they found Zod. He feigned almost no memory of his home or his name. Renamed Clark Kent, he was sent to live with the Kents under supervision from the Pentagon, and then began running tests on his powers when they started to develop. Zod fooled most of his superiors by acting dumb, while at the time he was murdering other agents looking for a device called "the Trigger", a device which could simultaneously detonate all power sources on the planet like bombs. Zod, knowing that, if activated, the Trigger would set off nuclear warheads, and that radiation was the only thing that could harm him, wanted the Trigger so he could destroy it. He was finally taken down by the other costumed agents, until the combined forces of the Bat and the Star were able to trap Zod in an orb of nuclear energy in space.
The post-Flashpoint Earth-40 has no such individual resident; it is a pulp fiction world dominated by villains, and an "opposite" world for Earth-20.
 A "Super deformed" version of Superman, Batman and the Justice League of America appeared in Superman/Batman #51 and #52. Grant Morrison's Action Comics (2011) run and The Multiversity later establish this world to be Earth-42 of the Multiverse.
 On Earth-44, the Superman of that world is a robot, a member of the Metal Men, robotic versions of Batman, Superman, Wonder Woman, Green Arrow, and Hawkman, created by Doc Tornado, an amalgamation of the Red Tornado and Will Magnus. Their base of operations separated with their Earth and collided with New Earth during Final Crisis #7, but New Earth's magnetic fields causes them to go berserk and attempt "technocide", destroying most of the mementos in the trophy room before they were shut down by Luthor and Dr. Sivana. He is given the name Gold Superman in The Multiversity Guidebook.
 Earth-45 is visited in Grant Morrison's Action Comics run. On this world, Clark Kent is a genius who with Jimmy and Lois intends to invent a robot – Superman – to protect the world. However, the company Overcorp creates a twisted Superman in the form of Superdoom, who rampaged the Multiverse until he was defeated by the Earth-23 Superman.
 Sunshine Superman is a version of Superman that was initially lost in the destruction of the infinite realities of the original Multiverse after the first Crisis. He first appeared as a memory projection of the Psycho-Pirate along with his teammates in the Love Syndicate of Dreamworld: Speed Freak (an alternative female version of the Flash) and Magic Lantern (an alternative version of Green Lantern) in Animal Man #23 and 24 (May–June 1990). However, his world was subsequently recreated in the reborn DC Multiverse and he is seen in Final Crisis #7 flying with various other Superman analogues. He is portrayed as a tall, muscular, African-American man with an Afro and a yellow sun shaped S-shield.  His name is a reference to the song "Sunshine Superman", by British singer Donovan. In The New 52, Sunshine Superman and other members of his Love Syndicate of Dreamworld exist on Earth-47 (which is based on the culture of the 1970s) and are financed by the immortal teen president "Prez" Rickard .
 DC's darker Wildstorm Comics imprint was designated as Earth-50 between 2005 and 2011, but Earth-50 was later merged with Earth-0 at the conclusion of Flashpoint; another Earth-50 then took its place.
 On the Wildstorm (pre-Flashpoint) Earth-50, Apollo is identified in Final Crisis #7 as a Superman of his world. Apollo was genetically enhanced to be a solar powered super-being. He is a member of the superhero team, the Authority, is openly gay, and is married to his superhero partner Midnighter, an analogue of Batman.
 Mister Majestic of the Wildstorm (pre-Flashpoint) Earth-50 is also shown in Final Crisis #7 as a Superman analogue. Majestros is an alien warlord from the planet Khera who crashed his ship on Earth thousands of years ago while at war with the Kherans' longtime enemies, the Daemonites. He and his fellow Kherans protect the Earth until the present day inspiring many of Earth's myths and legends. He is also an off and on member of the superhero team the WildC.A.T.s and Earth-50's most powerful hero. For a time he was thrown into the main DC Universe and filled in for Superman while Kal-El was trapped in Kandor. Majestros is nearly as strong as Superman with advanced longevity and is a born warrior with great intellectual prowess and centuries of experience.
 Following Flashpoint and the merger of Earth-0 and the Wildstorm Universe, Earth-50 is home to the evil Justice Lords from the Justice League animated series. On this world, Superman murdered President Lex Luthor in retaliation for his killing of the Flash, Wally West, prompting the Justice League to rebrand as the Justice Lords, the overseers of a brutal authoritarian regime.
 The superhero Icon is mentioned in Final Crisis: Superman Beyond #2 as being an analogue to Superman. Icon is an alien named Arnus from the planet Terminus who crashes his lifepod in the southern United States in 1839, and is found by an African American slave woman. The lifepod alters his DNA to match the male equivalent of hers, but to a highly evolved rate. After more than a century and a half he does not physically age past the age of 40 and has near Superman-level strength and similar powers. He works as a high-class attorney in his secret identity of Augustus Freeman IV, and protects and resides in the city of Dakota. Originally, Icon resided in an alternative reality of unknown designation until his universe was merged with the mainstream DC Universe after the events of Final Crisis.
 The first African-American version of Superman depicted was in Legends of the DC Universe: Crisis on Infinite Earths (February 1999), which saw a Kal-El and Kara who were husband and wife, and who had been selected as the last survivors of Krypton through polling selection. This Superman died early in the one-shot, leaving Supergirl to carry on, ultimately sacrificing herself.
 The Pocket Universe Superboy was created as an explanation for the existence of the Legion of Super-Heroes after Crisis on Infinite Earths. He is essentially identical to the Silver Age Superboy, the young version of Superman who becomes a Legion member, and he is far more powerful than the post-Crisis Superman.  This version of Superboy dies saving Earth of the Pocket Universe in Legion of Super-Heroes #38 (1987), years before he would have become Superman.

Other characters known as Superman
 Kon-El, the modern Superboy, is a clone created from the combined genetic material of the Man of Steel and Lex Luthor. He arrived in Metropolis shortly after Superman's death. Originally, he had no name besides "Superman". When the original Superman returned, he declared that the clone had earned the name "Superboy", much to his dismay. Superboy eventually became a hero is his own right, and Superman came to think of him as family, giving him the Kryptonian name of Kon-El and the human alias Conner Kent, cousin to Clark. Originally, Kon-El's origins were depicted as being created from genetically altered human DNA and made to look like Superman and to be as Kryptonian as possible, manipulating Superman's bio-electric aura into a telekinetic field, but eventually this was retconned so that 50% of his DNA actually does come from Superman (despite Cadmus earlier concluding that this was impossible due to the far greater complexity of Kryptonian DNA). They also learned that the genetically altered human DNA came from Luthor, rather than Paul Westfield as initially stated by Cadmus. In a future depicted in the Titans Tomorrow story arc, Conner becomes a tyrannical Superman after Kal-El dies again. Although Conner died during the Infinite Crisis (2006), his future self, as Superman, is part of a story arc in Teen Titans, published in late 2007. The second Titans Tomorrow Conner is Tim Drake's clone of the original. The first Conner returned to life during the events of Final Crisis in the story Final Crisis: Legion of Three Worlds and remained active within the DC Universe up until The New 52 reboot, where he is once again just beginning his career as a superhero.
 Hank Henshaw was one of several to claim the name of Superman, following the original's death. To differentiate him from the others, the press dubbed him the Cyborg Superman. After the Coast City incident, he was referred to simply as the Cyborg (not to be confused with Victor Stone).
 The Eradicator also emerged as a Superman impostor, "the Last Son of Krypton", during the Reign of the Supermen.  No longer able to absorb energy directly from the Sun, he used Kal-El's body as a power source. He eventually became delusional and believed himself to be Superman, but this taught him humanity. He eventually gave his life to stop the Cyborg Superman and restore Kal-El's powers.
 John Henry Irons made a suit of armor and cape emblazoned with the Superman-insignia, as tribute to the fallen Man of Steel. Unfortunately, he was lumped in with the other Superman impostors, even though he made no claim to the name. Eventually dubbed "Steel" by the resurrected Superman, he became a close ally and friend to Kal-El.
 The Superman Dynasty is the line of Superman's descendants and successors, featured in DC One Million. In this story, his first direct successor is called Superman Secundus. In the 853rd century, Kal Kent is the last scion of the dynasty, and leader of Justice Legion A. Essentially, he is the descendant of the same Superman from All-Star Superman.

Bizarros
Bizarro is the imperfect copy of Superman. There have been many incarnations of the character, varyingly portrayed as evil or as well-meaning but destructive. The Bizarros share many of the strengths and weaknesses of Superman, although there are some minor differences relating to kryptonite coloring and certain Kryptonian powers, for instance the Bizarros have at times been characterized by having heat breath and freeze vision.
 Bizarro Superboy was the first version of Bizarro to appear in comics, making his first (and only) appearance in Superboy #68 (1958). Created by accident, Bizarro Superboy is a misunderstood monster who only wants to be accepted, but most residents of Smallville, including Superboy, regard him as a menace. The only friend he makes is a blind girl, and in the end he sacrifices himself to restore her sight.
 The Silver and Bronze Age Bizarro #1 is accidentally created by Lex Luthor's duplicating ray when he uses it against Superman. Not only does he survive his initial encounter with Superman, he eventually gains a cast of supporting characters such as Bizarro versions of Lois, the Daily Planet staff, and the Justice League, and, eventually, Htrae, a cube-shaped world filled with Bizarros. His story comes to an end in Superman: Whatever Happened to the Man of Tomorrow? He strives to be the "perfect imperfect duplicate" of Superman, after being manipulated by Mr. Mxyzptlk. Since Superman saves people, he goes on a murder spree, and since Superman is a survivor of Krypton, he kills himself.
 The Man of Steel miniseries, which rebooted the Superman mythology in 1986, presents the first modern Bizarro, who is originally created by Lex Luthor. Because Luthor is unable to adequately replicate Kryptonian DNA, the clones' bodies would degenerate into a chalky-skinned caricature of the Man of Steel. This Bizarro, too, sacrificed his life to restore the eyesight of a blind girl, Lucy Lane, that had befriended him.
 Bizarro #1 is the only modern Bizarro that has survived, although he is not created like the others; having stolen the powers of Mr. Mxyzptlk, the Joker creates him (along with a Bizarro version of Batman, named Batzarro). Unlike the others, Bizarro #1's suit is purple-toned.
 In All-Star Superman, an entire race of Bizarros appear, who are spawned wholesale from a cube-shaped planet which originally belongs in the Underverse, an alternative universe on a different gravitonic plane than our own. Originally opaque, shapeless beings, they take on skewed characteristics of people they encounter. This planet also produced what might be the ultimate Bizarro - Zibarro, a sort of Bizarro Bizarro who is, by normal standards, sane - and therefore feared and reviled by his own people, as he is more closely related to Superman than he is to Bizarro.
 In Superman: Red Son, Bizarro was one of many creatures created by Lex Luthor and the American CIA in attempts to destroy the threat posed by the Communist Superman. This version was very similar in appearance to villain Solomon Grundy and wore a uniform similar to the original Golden Age Superman. He was said to have many of the same powers and abilities as Superman. After endangering much of London in his battle with Superman, Bizarro sacrificed himself to save the city from a nuclear detonation.
 The Multiversity Guidebook (2015) reveals that Earth-29, also known as Htrae, is a parallel world populated by Bizarro characters.

Other alternative depictions
Between 1989 and 2004, DC's Elseworlds imprint was used to showcase unofficial alternative universe stories; before 1989, "imaginary stories" served the same purpose. Since 2004, stories outside of the main DC continuity have carried no particular name or imprint. The examples listed below are just a few of the many alternative versions of Superman depicted in these stories.
 All-Star Superman is from the comic book of the same name. Writer Grant Morrison has said that for all intents and purposes, he is the Silver Age Superman, or at the very least has a backstory similar to that of the Silver Age version, including powers and continuity. For example, Clark Kent first reveals himself during childhood as Superboy, and Jonathan Kent has died (however, in actual Silver/Bronze Age stories, both Jonathan and Martha Kent died by the time Clark is active as Superman). This Superman is the one and same Superman Prime One Million from the DC One Million storyline, having evolved into a golden "god".

 Frank Miller's Superman

,  the,Superman of All Star Batman and Robin, the Boy Wonder, is not the same as the Superman of All-Star Superman. The artist of All-Star Batman, Jim Lee, has stated that he is based on the Golden Age Superman, which is why he is shown running on water instead of flying. However, they make no mention of this in the actual comic. Conversely, Frank Miller's Superman is seen flying in his other comics about Batman. This is notionally the same Superman who will evolve to the jingoistic government agent seen in The Dark Knight Returns and The Dark Knight Strikes Again, at least from Miller's authorial point of view, as there is no official canonical link between the All-Star and Dark Knight continuities yet.
 In Superman: The Dark Side (1998) Kal-El's rocket is diverted from Earth to Apokolips, and Superman is raised by Darkseid.
 Superman: True Brit is a humorous re-imagining of Superman in which the ship crashed in England and his career as a superhero is severely limited both by glory-averse adoptive parents and the scandal-hungry tabloid press.

 Superman, Inc. sees a world where Kal-El was placed in an orphanage rather than being found directly by the Kents, starting a chain of events that led to 'Dale Suderman' suppressing all memory of his powers after his foster mother died in an accident when she fell down a flight of stairs after witnessing him flying, Dale becoming withdrawn for years until he eventually found an outlet in sports. As a result, he becomes a major sports star and media figure, but when his actions undermine Lex Luthor's position, Luthor's research into his background exposes his otherworldly origins. At the story's conclusion, after a conversation with police detective 'John Jones' about his possible future, Dale goes into hiding as 'Clark Kent', taking journalism classes to find a normal life after publicly proclaiming that he is leaving Earth to investigate his true history and donating his fortune to a charitable foundation.
 Superman: Kal-El's- Kal-El's rocket lands on Earth in the Middle Ages, where he becomes a blacksmith's apprentice in a village ruled by Baron Luthor, who seeks to marry Lady Loisse, daughter of the village's murdered protector Lord Lane. After Kal uses his powers to forge the "silver egg" his parents found him in into a suit of armour for Baron Luthor, he asks for Loisse's hand in marriage as payment, but Luthor takes Loisse to his own bed on her wedding night due to an old feudal law- able to overpower Kal due to a kryptonite gemstone he wears- subsequently beating her to death while raping her. When Kal recovers the following morning, he leads a revolt against Luthor using a sword he forged for himself at the same time as he made Luthor's armour (the sword is implied to be Excalibur) In their final confrontation, Kal manages to slay Luthor, but he is severely wounded by Luthor's gemstone in the process, the story concluding with him being laid to rest in the lake where Loisse's body was thrown after her death.
 Superman: Speeding Bullets has Superman found and adopted by the Waynes and christened Bruce. He sees his foster parents murdered in front of him and grows up to be a superpowered Batman, but decides to change tactics after a confrontation with the Joker (in this reality an insane Lex Luthor) and a conversation with Lois about the need for him to inspire rather than intimidate. Earlier imaginary stories, such as the stories of "Bruce (Superman) Wayne" told in Superman (vol. 1) #353, #358 and #363 (1980–1981), also explored the scenario of the infant Kal-El being adopted by the Waynes.
 Superman: Last Son of Earth is a dramatic role reversal for many Superman traditions. In this story, he is Clark Kent, biological son of Jonathan and Martha Kent, who is sent into space to escape the impending destruction of Earth by collision with a space rock. He lands on Krypton and is adopted by Jor-El and Lara as their son, Kal-El, eventually discovering an Oan power ring.
 In Superman: Secret Identity, a teenage boy named Clark Kent in the "real world" (where Superman is a just a comic book character) somehow develops superpowers like those of his namesake. After a brief career as a mysterious, non-costumed "Superboy", Clark dons the fictional character's colors and continues to work in secret as "Superman".
 Superman & Batman: Generations I-III, three limited series which present a unified cohesive history of many elements seen throughout the characters' history, with the characters interacting in real time from the early 20th century onward.
 In Batman: Holy Terror (1991), the body of an alien known simply as "the Green Man" with a similar origin to Superman is shown, and his origin is described during this story. When he sees the body of the Green Man, Batman is struck by sorrow, feeling as though the world has lost its greatest hope. During the confrontation with Doctor Erdel, the scientists responsible for analysing various superhumans for the Star Chamber, Erdel is killed when a bullet ricochets off the Green Man's chest to strike Erdel.
 The Booster Gold story arc "52 Pick-Up" briefly depicts a Superman in Booster Gold #3, when showing a timeline where Superman was found by Lionel Luthor and raised as Lionel Jr. alongside Lex Luthor. Lex finds out his brother's secret and ends up killing him a year later.
 The Hypertension storyline in Superboy #60-64 (1999) shows an alternative version of Kon-El named Black Zero. Black Zero is a genetically altered human clone of Superman (just as Kon-El was from 1993 to 2003) that has successfully grown to adulthood after Superman dies at the hands of Doomsday. For a time, he acts as the new Superman, even calling himself Superman 2. He exhibits both Superman's abilities as well as Superboy's tactile telekinesis. Without Superman alive to look up to, he instead views head of Cadmus Paul Westfield as his father figure. Eventually he turns to evil after a battle between himself and several of Superman's enemies results in the deaths of Matrix, Brainiac and over 300 innocent people which causes widespread persecution of clones. He first conquers his Earth, then enlists the help of the New God Metron to travel to alternative realities and conquer them as well to protect the clone community. He is defeated by the combined efforts of Kon-El, multiple versions of Superboy and the Challengers of the Unknown. He is lost in Hypertime at the end of the story and has not been seen since.
In Unlimited Access, a limited series which further explored themes introduced in DC vs. Marvel, the hero known as Access formed an amalgamation of what appeared to be the Silver Age versions of Thor and Superman (in his then-current blue energy form). Together, they were known as Thor-El.
 In the Just Imagine... series, Superman is reimagined as a police officer from Krypton named Salden who is accidentally transported to Earth and only wishes to go home. He becomes a superhero because he believes Earth's primitive technology is a result of humans squandering their resources fighting crime, corruption, and other ills, and that alleviating these problems will allow humanity to advance to the point of creating a means to send him home. He has superhuman strength and speed, and wears a flying harness. This version was created by Stan Lee and John Buscema.
 Marvel/DC Crossovers - In the majority of the Marvel/DC crossovers, Superman is from the same universe as many Marvel characters, as in an Elseworlds story.
 JLA: Shogun of Steel (2002), set in feudal Japan, features a Japanese Superman.
 Multiple versions of Superman appeared in Superman/Batman #25's "Supermen/Batmen", who come to aid the mainstream Superman. Among them are Bizarro #1; Superman Red; a blond-haired Superman; a Superman depicted as a stereotypical African-American; a Superman with a different style "S" shield resembling the Golden Age Superman's in Action Comics#1; and a black-suited, long-haired Superman from "The Return of Superman".
 Injustice: Gods Among Us (2013), is a video game and tie-in comic book depicting a world in which Superman presides over an authoritarian regime. In this alternate universe Superman is married to Lois Lane, who becomes pregnant with his child. However, the Joker tricks Superman into killing Lois and their unborn son, and  a nuke placed on Lois' heart detonates upon her death, destroying Metropolis and killing millions. Driven over the edge by this, Superman kills the Joker in retaliation. Now corrupted, Superman takes drastic measures to "save" the world, forcing people to follow his will and killing those who resist. 
JLA: The Nail and JLA: Another Nail show a Superman in which Kal-El was raised by Amish folk instead of the Kents. His Amish upbringing delays Superman from revealing himself to the world, which places Green Lantern (Hal Jordan) as the leader and most powerful member of the Justice League until Superman's discovery. This Superman is more humble, less in touch with the outside world, calmer and less experienced than other incarnations. 
 In the alternative timeline of the Flashpoint event, Kal-El's rocket crashed directly into Metropolis, resulting in the deaths of over thirty-five thousand people, and the infant was subsequently taken into government captivity to control his powers for uses to make supersoldiers. Sam Lane takes a liking to him, as he becomes the son Lane never had. Kal-El later makes friends with Krypto, who was also being held in the facility, but they are separated after Kal fails to appease the government workers. Kal-El is helped by Neil Sinclair to free himself, and attacks Sam. Kal-El makes his way to Lane's office, where he finds Lois Lane, Sam's young daughter. Sinclair attempts to kill Lois, but Kal protects her. Sam uses a Phantom Zone gun to send himself and Sinclair into the Phantom Zone. Afterward, Kal-El is deemed Subject 1 and placed in a government underground bunker life sentence by General Nathaniel Adam. Sometime later, attempting to rally support in his attempt to restore the timeline to normal, the Flash, aided by Batman and Cyborg break into the facility where Kal-El is being kept, only to find a very thin man incapable of speech who seems terrified just at the sight of others. Once they break out into the daylight, Kal-El rises into the air. He uses his heat vision on the attacking guards and flies away. Kal-El arrives in Western Europe and rescues Lois from the Amazons who are attempting to kill her. Just as the two reunite, Sinclair attacks them. While Sinclair fights some Amazons, Lois tells Kal-El that he must leave. He refuses and says that he learned from Sam that they must protect people from villains like Sinclair. Kal-El manages to overload Sinclair's body with energy, and punches him through the chest, killing him in a huge explosion; Lois is unfortunately caught in the blast. Kal-El holds the dying Lois in his arms, and Lois tells him to save the people. Kal-El arrives at the scene of the Atlantean/Amazon war and intends to attack both leaders Aquaman and Wonder Woman at the last battle.
 In the alternate universe of Nightwing: The New Order, a major battle takes place in Metropolis between superpowered beings that causes the deaths of millions. During the conflict, Superman was infected with black kryptonite and murders Batman. This results in Nightwing activating a device that depowers ninety percent of the superpowered population. This builds to a future where superpowers are outlawed and any superpowered being must take inhibitor medications or be contained and studied. Despite being depowered, Superman still defends Metropolis as a vigilante with the help of Lex Luthor.
In Superman: American Alien, by Max Landis, Clark's journey to becoming Superman is shown at different stages in his life. He first manifests his ability to fly while asleep as a child, which causes some trouble when he finds he cannot control it. He eventually gains better control of it and also gains a better understanding of empathy and consequences. As a teenager, he spends his time crushing on Lana Lang and spending time with his friends Pete Ross and Kenny, who are aware of his abilities. Things grow dark, however, when a murder takes place, and after an argument with Pete Clark tracks down the murderer and tries to stop them. He is hurt by the bullets, due to his powers having not fully developed, and in fear uses his heat vision on his attackers. When he is nineteen Clark wins a trip to the Caribbean, but the helicopter crashes near a yacht. Saving the pilot and coming on board, Clark is mistaken for Bruce Wayne due to it being his party. After some hesitation, he decides to enjoy himself and meets Oliver Queen, Sue Dearbon, Vic Zsasz and Barbara Ann Minerva, with whom he has a romantic fling. During the night, Clark is drugged by Deathstroke who tries to kill him, but Clark's powers surprise the assassin and result in Clark flicking him off the yacht. Afterwards Clark offers Barbara the choice to stay with him, but she refuses. Years later, Clark moves to Metropolis to be a reporter and on his first day he encounters Lois Lane and is reunited with Oliver, who forgives Clark after the latter comes clean about the mistaken identity. Oliver takes Clark to Lexcorp and introduces him to Lex Luthor. Clark interviews him, learning about Lex's arrogant and power-obsessed nature. Before leaving Lexcorp, Clark finds himself in a nursery and encounters Dick Grayson and after seeing everything that was in Dick's pockets as they agreed (using his x-ray vision), the two have a long discussion about Bruce Wayne and eventually Batman, with Dick accurately describing how the vigilante needs someone to balance out his darkness and fear with light and hope, foreshadowing the usual relationship between Superman and Batman. Afterwards, Clark is attacked by Batman, who is then overpowered by Clark and revealed as Bruce Wayne. Batman escapes, leaving behind his cape and Clark's recording of his conversation with Dick, and in return Clark does not reveal the truth about Bruce Wayne's double life. Approximately six months later, Clark has created a makeshift costume that includes Batman's cape and fights crime, and encounters Parasite. After defeating him, he learns that Parasite was created by Lex Luthor and confronts him. However, he is surprised and unable to respond when Lex swiftly explains how Clark made the mistake of confronting him with no actual plan.  Clark leaves depressed, but after a conversation with Lois about his other identity (which she has no awareness of) becomes more determined and starts to use the name Superman, after what Lex had called him. After a unknown amount of time, Clark has started to wear the traditional Superman costume and is slowly entering a relationship with Lois, though it is not serious, and is visited by Pete and Kenny. Clark shows them around and introduces them to Jimmy Olsen, before the three head back to Clark's apartment. While talking about Batman, Kenny and Pete suggests he tries to contact the other people like him (such as the red blur in Central City, a woman with a lasso in DC, and a fish guy who sinks whaling boats). However Clark does not see them as like him, and this leads to an argument between him and Pete when he says that he has no intention of being Superman forever. Pete calls Clark out on how irresponsible he is being by not seeing the change he is creating as Superman, and how he worries everyone who know the truth about him, since they do not know what his intentions are by being Superman. This leads Clark to admit that he is hoping that any videos of him saving people with the symbol from his ship on his costume will be sent into space, and whoever left him on Earth would come back. When Clark attempts to turn the argument around by saying Pete is jealous, his friend points out that he is changing the world by accident and needs to stop waiting around and really do something, and that he is letting down his real parents who raised him. This upsets Clark and he attempts to fly to the Moon, but burns away his clothes when reaching the atmosphere and starts to choke due to a lack of oxygen. Before he can die he is saved by Abin Sur and Tomar-Re, who identify him as a Kryptonian before leaving him back on Earth. Clark reconciles with Pete, now apparently a little happier by knowing the name of his species. Skipping forward a few years later, Clark is living with Lois and is texting to Jimmy about having received a less than enthusiastic response from her when he told her that he loved her, when he hears explosions. He investigates as Superman and encounters Lobo, who reveals that Krypton exploded years ago and that the Kryptonians are dead. Finally accepting his human roots and letting go of his obsession with his alien origins, Clark battles Lobo and makes him leave the planet. Then as Clark, he checks himself into the hospital under the lie he was harmed in the battle, and Lois arrived and tells him that she loves him.

Film and television

 In the Superman cartoons produced by Max Fleischer, Superman is much as he appears in the first years of Action Comics ' publication, despite changes in his costume, notably the all-red belt or absence of one in later cartoons, and the S-shield with a darkened blue plane and a red S instead of the yellow plane with the red S. He is said to have been found by "a passing motorist" who brought him to an orphanage. This version of Superman lives in and protects Manhattan rather than Metropolis, although in some cartoons such as "The Bulleteers", Metropolis is clearly named by the antagonists.
 Kirk Alyn starred as Superman in two 15-chapter serials produced by Columbia Pictures, Superman (1948) and Atom Man vs. Superman (1950). In it, Superman has many of the powers demonstrated in the comics. The origin story is similar to what is described in a 1942 novel about Superman, with his foster parents being named Sarah and Eben.
 Adventures of Superman (1952–1958) was a television series that featured George Reeves in the title role, which he first played in the 1951 movie Superman and the Mole Men. While he had many of the powers demonstrated in the comics, they are not shown at the tremendous levels depicted in the contemporary Silver Age comics. The show often featured Superman battling generic gangsters.
 In 1966, Filmation produced The New Adventures of Superman and from 1973 to 1986, Hanna Barbera produced different versions of the Justice League-influenced Super Friends, both of which were animated series aimed at children. In both cartoons, Superman was similar to his contemporaneous comic book counterpart. In one episode of The World's Greatest Super Friends, the Super Friends battled evil Super Friends from an alternative universe, led by an evil Superman.
 In the 1978 feature film Superman and its sequels, Superman II, Superman III, and Superman IV: The Quest for Peace, Superman is portrayed by Christopher Reeve and is depicted as possessing an array of abilities never before seen in the comics. He was able to erase Lois' memory of his secret identity with a kiss, restore the Great Wall of China with the use of blue eye beams, and possibly teleport among other abilities. Kryptonian foes such as General Zod even demonstrated telekinetic ability.
 In 1988, the producers of Superman (1978) produced a syndicated TV series entitled Superboy which featured John Haymes Newton in the role for one season before he was fired and replaced by Gerard Christopher. The show concentrated on a college-aged Kal-El as a journalism student at Siegel University. Legal issues have prevented the series from ever reairing in any syndication market, although the complete series has been released on DVD.
 The 1988 Superman series, produced by Ruby-Spears Productions, offered the first animated incarnation of the Post-Crisis Superman.  Acting as story editor, Crisis on Infinite Earths writer Marv Wolfman provided several changes to this Superman that included elements from The Man of Steel. In this series, Lex Luthor is not a publicly known criminal, but a rich entrepreneur instead. Clark Kent is Superman's alter ego, instead of the other way around.  Furthermore, Martha and Jonathan Kent are still alive in Superman's adulthood in this series. This version of Superman was never Superboy as a teenager, although his powers had appeared very early in childhood. Clark Kent is clumsy in this series.
 In Lois and Clark: The New Adventures of Superman, Dean Cain played the first live-action Superman affected by the changes to the character after Crisis on Infinite Earths, and various elements on the series reference The Man of Steel miniseries, which heavily influenced the show. This is the first live action Superman series that showed Clark Kent as his "real" persona and Superman as the constructed alter ego. As he explained to Lois in the second-season episode "Tempus Fugitive", "Superman is what I can do, Clark is who I am." As the title implies, Clark is the primary identity with Superman making more sporadic appearances. The Lois and Clark version reverses the traditional hairstyle distinction between Clark Kent and Superman; here it is Superman who has slicked-back hair and Clark whose fringe falls more naturally. In neither mode does the character feature his trademark spitcurl, making it one of the few depictions of Superman to lack this distinctive feature. His full name was changed from the comic strip adaptations to Clark Jerome Kent.
 The Superman of the DC animated universe is a synthesis of Superman's 60-plus year history. At first glance, it appears to be an adaptation of The Man of Steel, but also took many aspects of the Silver Age and modernized them. In this continuity, Superman was believed to be the only Kryptonian survivor until Professor Hamilton found a device with access to the Phantom Zone, where two other Kryptonians were found. Kara In-Ze (Supergirl) from Krypton's "sister" planet, Argo, and the artificial intelligence of Brainiac were also shown to be survivors of Krypton's destruction. His archenemy is the "wealthy business tycoon" version of Lex Luthor. His parents are still alive, and this Superman was never Superboy. In Justice League Unlimited, which follows the continuity of the animated series (as well as Batman: The Animated Series), Superman is portrayed as slightly older and a different voice actor portrays him (although cast members such as Dana Delany and Clancy Brown re-appeared in guest appearances).
 The Clark Kent of the Smallville TV series leads his life differently, never becoming Superboy, although he secretly performed heroic feats as a teenager and young man before moving to Metropolis and becoming its resident superhero. He meets Lois at a younger age, maintains a complicated friendship with Lex Luthor into young adulthood and for the most part of the series was romantically interested in Lana Lang. This Clark discovers the Fortress of Solitude, was one of only six real Kryptonians to survive Krypton's destruction, meets Vic Stone, Bart Allen, Black Canary, Aquaman, Green Arrow, his cousin Kara Zor-El, the Martian Manhunter, Zatanna, three Legionnaires, the Justice Society of America, Perry White, Jimmy Olsen, Maggie Sawyer, and Jor-El, and has even fought Zod, Brainiac, Mister Mxyzptlk, Faora, Maxima, Bizarro and Doomsday, but assumed his superhero identity only after he defeated Darkseid. Clark's best friends in this version was Chloe Sullivan, who for a while worked as a reporter for the Daily Planet, and for the first few seasons, an African-American Pete Ross. During the series finale of the ten seasons of the show, Clark finally managed to fulfill his destiny and became Superman.
 In Superman Returns, Brandon Routh takes over the role of Superman. Director Bryan Singer had stated that this film's continuity is based only loosely on the first two Superman films directed by Richard Donner and Richard Lester, and thus Reeve and Routh's Supermen, though similar in places (even having identical fathers—Jor-El played by Marlon Brando and Jonathan Kent played by Glenn Ford), may not be exactly the same individual. For example, the events of the third and fourth films, including also a movie spin-off from 1984 called Supergirl, are ignored.
 The animated series Legion of Super Heroes features a teenage Superman, who, like the original Superboy, travels to the future to join the Legion. As shown in the first episode of the series, in his own time, the early 21st century, Clark Kent secretly performs heroic deeds, but has not yet donned the Superman costume. In addition to Clark, the second season features a Superman from the 41st Century named Kell-El, who is cloned (in part) from the original. In the second two-part second-season finale of Legion of the Superheroes, Saturn Girl fused Kell-El and Superman so they could stay projected in Brainiac 5's mind. This Supreme Superman almost beat Brainiac 1.0.
 The animated series The Batman featured Superman in the two-part season 5 episode "The Batman/Superman Story". This Superman is not related to previous animated versions of the character. George Newbern, the actor that voiced him on Justice League and Justice League Unlimited, reprised the role.
Clark Kent / Superman is portrayed by Henry Cavill in the DC Extended Universe, first appearing in the 2013 movie Man of Steel, a reboot of the Superman film series. Jor-El (played by Russell Crowe) and Lara (played by Ayelet Zurer) imbue Kal-El with the genetic codex of the entire Kryptonian race before sending him to Earth. He arrives on Earth in 1980, and is 33 years old during the present timeline of the film. Jonathan and Martha Kent (played by Kevin Costner and Diane Lane, respectively) are depicted as being around 30 when they find him. Jonathan is 46 when he dies in 1997, killed by a tornado outbreak, refusing help from his son to keep his powers secret in what he believed was an unprepared world. Martha helped Clark control his powers while he is young. Deciding it is time for him to find out the reason for why he was sent to Earth, he travels the world and takes a series of odd jobs under assumed identities in his 20s, including a crabber, but leaves each job when he is forced to use his powers for good, leaving a trail of urban legends which Lois Lane (played by Amy Adams) eventually finds and investigates. Clark's lifelong secrecy comes to an end when General Zod (Michael Shannon) arrives on Earth to transform Earth into a new Krypton after the destruction of the planet, as he is forced to take the mantle of Superman to stop him. He would later be confronted by Batman (Ben Affleck) in the wake of the destruction his final battle with Zod caused, but teams up with him and Wonder Woman (Gal Gadot) to take down Doomsday (created by Lex Luthor), in which he apparently sacrifices his life in the process. In the 2017 movie Justice League and its 2021 director's cut Zack Snyder's Justice League, Clark Kent's body is exhumed and placed in the incubation waters of the Kryptonian ship alongside the Mother Box, which in turn activates and successfully resurrects Superman. Following the events of the film, Superman resumes his life as reporter Clark Kent.

References

Fictional characters from parallel universes
Kryptonians
Superman
 
Superman lists
Superman
Alternative versions of Superman